Rimswell is a village and civil parish in the East Riding of Yorkshire, England, in an area known as Holderness.

The civil parish is formed by the village of Rimswell and the hamlet of Waxholme.
According to the 2011 UK census, Rimswell parish had a population of 235, an increase on the 2001 UK census figure of 198.

The parish church of St Mary (now closed) is a Grade II listed building.

The Prime Meridian passes just to the east of Rimswell.

In 1823 Rimswell was in the parish of Owthorne, a village since lost to coastal erosion. Rimswell inhabitants numbered 129, and occupations included ten farmers, some of whom were land owners, a grocer, and the landlord of the Dog and Duck public house. A carrier operated between the village and Hull on Tuesdays.

References

External links

Villages in the East Riding of Yorkshire
Holderness
Civil parishes in the East Riding of Yorkshire